The Loudi South railway station or Loudinan railway station is a railway station of the Shanghai–Kunming high-speed railway and Loudi–Shaoyang railway located in Loudi, Hunan, People's Republic of China.

Railway stations in Hunan
Stations on the Shanghai–Kunming High-Speed Railway
Railway stations in Loudi